Charrington Tower, originally called Providence Tower, is a 44-storey 136 m (446 ft) residential tower located in the New Providence Wharf development on the north side of the River Thames in the Blackwall area of east London, completed in 2016.

It was commissioned by the developer Ballymore, designed by the Skidmore, Owings & Merrill architecture firm, and built by Balfour Beatty. The project was announced in Singapore in June 2012, followed by "investor events" in Hong Kong and Singapore in September 2012.

References

Residential skyscrapers in London
Buildings and structures under construction in the United Kingdom
Skidmore, Owings & Merrill buildings
Skyscrapers in the London Borough of Tower Hamlets
Blackwall, London